This is for the festival in Arizona. See Helldorado Days (Las Vegas) for the festival in Nevada.
Helldorado Days is a festival that began in Tombstone, Arizona in 1929 and is held every year in October.  In 2008, 30 different entertainment groups participated, including belly dancers, line dancers, and musical groups. There was also a parade.

History 
Helldorado Days, started in 1929 to celebrate the fiftieth anniversary of the founding of Tombstone. The Tombstone Epitaph newspaper stated that  - by staging historic reenactments, bringing’ back pioneers of the day, exhibiting artifacts of the day against the backdrop of Tombstone, “the show will be Tombstone.” Helldorado Days takes place on the 3rd complete weekend of October and is currently sponsored by Helldorado, Inc. whose membership is composed of residents in Cochise County.

References 

Tombstone, Arizona
Music festivals in Arizona
1929 establishments in Arizona
Festivals established in 1929
October events
History of Cochise County, Arizona
Tourist attractions in Cochise County, Arizona